PSM, an acronym,  may refer to:

Organizations
 Sepaktakraw Association of Malaysia (PSM), a national governing body in Malaysia.
 Pakistan School Muscat, a Pakistani co-educational institute in Oman
 Palestine Solidarity Movement, a student organization in the United States
 Panhellenic Socialist Movement, a centre-left party in Greece
 Parti Sosialis Malaysia, a socialist political party in Malaysia
 PlayStation: The Official Magazine, a magazine originally known as PlayStation Magazine or PSM
 Ponce School of Medicine, a post-graduate medical school located in Ponce, Puerto Rico
 Power Systems Mfg, a subsidiary of Alstom, specializing in aftermarket gas turbine servicing for power generating industry.
 Poznańska Spółdzielnia Mieszkaniowa, a housing cooperative administering most of the Piątkowo district of Poznań, Poland
 PSM3, a UK video game magazine specializing in Sony consoles
 PSM Makassar, a football club that plays in the Liga Indonesia
 PSM-Nationalist Agreement, a federation of regionalist or progressive-stateless nationalist political parties in the Balearic Islands
 Public Service Media, media whose primary mission is public service
 Photographic Society of Madras, a not for profit organisation involved in promoting photography, in Chennai
 Providence St. Mel School, a school in Chicago, USA

Scholarship
The Protocols of the Elders of Zion, acronym for Protokoly sionskix mudrecov or The Protocols of the Elders of Zion, a tract alleging a Judeo-Masonic plot for world domination
 Professional Science Master's, a postgraduate academic degree program established by the Council of Graduate Schools

Science
 Paraspinal Musculature, the muscles adjacent to the vertebral column
Plastarch material, or PSM, a biodegradable and thermoplastic resin
Phase-shift keying, or Phase Shift Modulation, a digital modulation scheme
Phase-shift mask, photomasks that take advantage of interference to improve image resolution in photolithography
Phenol-soluble modulin, a family of protein toxins produced by CA-MRSA
Phenomenal Self model, in consciousness what comprises experiences of ownership, of first person perspective, and of a long-term unity of beliefs and attitudes
Platform-specific model, a model of a software or business system that is linked to a specific technological platform
Phono-semantic matching, a term in linguistics that refers to camouflaged borrowing
Propensity score matching, a statistical method used to provide unbiased estimation of treatment-effects.
 Peptide spectrum match, a (possible) identified peptide in a protein mass spectrometry identification experiment

Locations
 Port St Mary, a port town in the south of the Isle of Man
 Portsmouth International Airport at Pease, IATA code PSM, a public-use joint civil-military airport
 El Puerto de Santa María, a city located on the banks of the Guadalete River in the province of Cádiz, Spain

Other uses
Protocol/Service Multiplexer, a port number in Bluetooth L2CAP
PSM pistol, a self-defense firearm for law enforcement and military officers of the USSR
Poste sanitaire mobile, a type of French Field hospitals (France)
 Process Safety Management, a regulation intended to prevent an incident like the 1984 Bhopal Disaster
Platoon Sergeant Major, a short-lived rank in the British Army of Warrant Officer Class III
PlayStation Move, the motion controller for PlayStation 3
PlayStation Mobile, the software framework
Pro Stock Motorcycle, a drag racing class of motorcycle that is the two-wheeled equivalent of Pro Stock
Van Westendorp's Price Sensitivity Meter, a market technique for determining consumer price preferences
"Paranoia Survivor Max", a song by 290 from the music video game Dance Dance Revolution Extreme
Policy Simulation Model, a static microsimulation model which encapsulates the tax and benefits system, and population, of Great Britain
Portia Simpson-Miller, former Prime Minister of Jamaica
Post-stall maneuver
Public Service Medal (Australia), a civil decoration awarded to personnel of all levels of the Australian Public Service for outstanding service
ProTracker Studio format, a module file format that was used in many games published by Epic Games in the early 1990s
Professional Scrum Master, a recognized certification for Scrum Master role in Scrum (software development)
Professional Securities Market, an equity market of the London Stock Exchange
Plant (or Potato) Starch Material, generic label for compostable plant-based materials used as alternatives to plastics for items such as disposable cutlery, broader meaning than Plastarch
Persistent Stored Modules, an ISO standard mainly defining an extension of SQL
Permanent Magnet Synchronous Motor
Permanent Staff Member, e.g. for a Congressional committee

See also